Almeidas Province is one of the 15 provinces in the Cundinamarca Department, Colombia. Almeidas borders to the east with the Boyacá Department to the north with the Ubaté Province, to the west with the Central Savanna Province and to the south with the Guavio Province.

Subdivision 
Almeidas is subdivided into 7 municipalities:

References

External links 
  Almeidas Province in Cundinamarca

Provinces of Cundinamarca Department